Doumer Island is an island  long and  wide, surmounted by a snow-covered pyramidal peak, lying between the south portions of Anvers Island and Wiencke Island in the Palmer Archipelago of Antarctica. It was first seen by the Belgian Antarctic Expedition, 1897–99, under Adrien de Gerlache. It was resighted and charted by the French Antarctic Expedition, 1903–05, under Jean-Baptiste Charcot, who named it for Paul Doumer, President of the French Chamber of Deputies and later President of France.

Yelcho Station
Chile's summer Yelcho research station, administered by the Chilean Antarctic Institute, stands on the southern shore of South Bay.

Features 
 Gauthier Point, the northern extremity of Doumer Island
 Homeward Point, the west side of the entrance to Security Bay, on Doumer Island
 Lefèvre-Utile Point, along the north side of Doumer Island
 Stokes Hill

See also 
 Gerlache Strait Geology
 List of Antarctic and subantarctic islands
 List of Antarctic research stations
 List of Antarctic field camps

References

External links

 
Islands of the Palmer Archipelago